Nicolas “Nic” Roy (born February 5, 1997) is a Canadian professional ice hockey centre currently playing for the Vegas Golden Knights of the National Hockey League (NHL). Roy was drafted by the Carolina Hurricanes, 96th overall, in the 2015 NHL Entry Draft.

Prior to turning professional, Roy had a prolific major junior hockey career with the Chicoutimi Saguenéens. Although he was drafted first overall by the Cape Breton Screaming Eagles at the 2013 Quebec Major Junior Hockey League (QMJHL) Entry Draft, he refused to play for the league unless his rights were traded to a Quebec-based one.

Internationally, Roy has competed for Team Canada at the 2014 Ivan Hlinka Memorial Tournament, 2015 IIHF World U18 Championships, and 2017 World Junior Ice Hockey Championships.

Early life
Roy was born on February 5, 1997, in Amos, Quebec, Canada, to parents Nick and Lisa Roy. His sister Mélina is also a hockey player and competed for Team Quebec at the 2012 National Women’s Under-18 Championship.

Playing career

Youth
Roy played minor ice hockey for the Rouyn-Noranda Huskies Bantam AA in the MMBAA during the 2010–11 season. He began his Quebec midget AAA hockey career at the age of 14 with the Amos Forestiers. In his rookie season with the team, he played in 43 regular season games as he led the team to the QMAAA quarterfinals.  As a result of his play, Roy was invited to attend the Allstate All-Canadians mentorship camp in 2012. He also competed for Team Québec White at the QGC-16 in 2013 and received the QMAAA's Prospect Award.

Junior
While playing in the QMAAA, Roy was deemed the unanimous first overall pick in the Quebec Major Junior Hockey League (QMJHL) draft. Prior to the QMJHL draft, Roy's father Nick stated that if his son was selected first overall by the Cape Breton Screaming Eagles at the 2013 QMJHL Draft, they would pursue other options if his rights were not traded to a Quebec team. One of the reasons for this was because Roy wished to enroll in CEGEP locally. In spite of this, Roy was selected first overall by the Cape Breton Screaming Eagles at the draft but refused to play in the league unless his rights were traded. 

On September 6, 2013, the Screaming Eagles caved and traded him to the Chicoutimi Saguenéens in exchange for Chicoutimi’s first round picks in the 2014, 2015 and 2016 QMJHL drafts. As a result of Roy's decision to not play for his draft team, in advance of the 2014 QMJHL Entry Draft, the QMJHL made a rule change concerning the protocol for compensatory draft picks in the event of a non-reporting player.

In his rookie season, Roy was named an assistant captain for the team. where he finished his rookie campaign recording 16 goals and 25 assists in 63 regular season games.  His sophomore campaign during the 2014–15 QMJHL season proved to be more successful than his first as he was selected for the CHL Top Prospects Game and set new career highs in goals, assists, and points. 

Leading up to the 2015 NHL Entry Draft, Roy was ranked 45th among North American skaters by the NHL Central Scouting Bureau. He was eventually taken in the fourth round, 96th overall, by the Carolina Hurricanes. Upon returning to the QMJHL for the 2015–16 QMJHL season, Roy was appointed the Saguenéens's newest captain to replace Laurent Dauphin. In his first season with the "C," Roy led all QMJHL skaters in goals and recorded a career high 90 points in 63 games. He also led the team to the 2016 QMJHL playoffs, where he recorded seven points in an eventual six game loss in the first round to Cape Breton.  At the conclusion of the 2015–16 season, Roy was named to the QMJHL First All-Star Team and signed a three-year, entry-level contract with the Carolina Hurricanes. He subsequently joined the Hurricanes American Hockey League (AHL) affiliate, the Charlotte Checkers, for the remainder of the season. 

After playing in two games for the Checkers, Roy returned to his hometown of Amos to spend his summer training with kinesiologist Josianne Domingue. He eventually returned to the QMJHL for the 2016–17 season to complete his major junior career. In his final season, Roy was again named to the QMJHL First All-Star Team and received the league's Guy Carbonneau Trophy. As a result of his academic success while attending Cégep de Chicoutimi, he was also a finalist for the Marcel Robert Trophy, an award given to the best student-athlete in the QMJHL.

Professional

Carolina Hurricanes
Roy attended the Hurricanes training camp prior to the 2017–18 season, but was reassigned to the Checkers alongside Valentin Zykov, Aleksi Saarela, Trevor Carrick, Jake Chelios, and Jeremy Smith. By the conclusion of his rookie campaign, Roy recorded 37 points in 68 games to tie for eighth place among rookies in the AHL. He eventually made his NHL debut on April 7, 2018, in the last game of the Hurricanes season.

Roy began the 2018–19 season in the American Hockey League after attending the Hurricanes training camp. With the Checkers, Roy recorded 36 points in 69 games as the team qualified for the 2019 Calder Cup playoffs. In the postseason, Roy recorded 15 points, including six goals, in 19 games to help the Checkers clinch the Cup.

Vegas Golden Knights
On June 26, 2019, Roy was traded by the Hurricanes, along with a conditional 2021 fifth-round pick, to the Vegas Golden Knights in exchange for Erik Haula. He attended their 2019 training camp and played alongside fellow French speaker Jonathan Marchessault, which he said helped him a lot.

During the 2019–20 NHL season, Roy frequently moved between the Golden Knights and their AHL affiliate, the Chicago Wolves, making up 15 of 67 total transactions by December. He recorded his first career NHL goal on October 27, in a 5–2 win over the Anaheim Ducks. His goal, which turned out to be the game-winner, occurred while centering the Knights' fourth line with Ryan Reaves and William Carrier. Later that season, he recorded a goal with an assist from Nick Cousins and Nick Holden, making them the first trio of "Nicks" to combine on a goal. On April 22, 2020, Roy signed a two-year contract extension with the Golden Knights that accounted for $750,000 against the salary cap.

International play

Roy's first international campaign is with Team Canada Quebec at the 2014 U17 World Hockey Challenge. He would play for Team Canada in the Hlinka Gretzky Cup, where he won a gold medal.

On April 15, 2015, Roy was named to the Team Canada's final roster prior to the 2015 IIHF World U18 Championship as he helped them claim the bronze medal. He also competed with Team Canada at the 2017 World Junior Ice Hockey Championships where he helped them win a silver medal.

Roy along with Golden Knights teammates Logan Thompson and Zach Whitecloud made their senior debut with Team Canada at the 2022 IIHF World Championship where he scored five points as they claim silver in a 4-3 overtime loss to Finland.

Career statistics

Regular season and playoffs

International

Awards and honours

References

External links

1997 births
Living people
Canadian ice hockey centres
Carolina Hurricanes draft picks
Carolina Hurricanes players
Charlotte Checkers (2010–) players
Chicago Wolves players
Chicoutimi Saguenéens (QMJHL) players
Ice hockey people from Quebec
People from Amos, Quebec
Vegas Golden Knights players